Watervliet is a city in Berrien County in the U.S. state of Michigan. Located in the northeastern part of the county, the population was 1,735 at the 2010 census, down from 1,843 at the 2000 census. Mostly a rural farming community, the name comes from the Dutch for "where the waters meet."  The city is surrounded by Watervliet Charter Township but is administered autonomously.

Geography

History
In 1905 John Olsen and Maud Nelson moved here where they established a women's baseball team. Both of them had experience in the game. The "Cherokee Indian Baseball Team" set out in its Pullman car in the same year complete with an electric light facility, a grand stand and a 12 by 1200 foot fence. Nelson who was born in Italy was on the team. She was billed by her husband, Olsen, as the undisputed women's champion pitcher of the world.

Demographics

2010 census
As of the census of 2010, there were 1,735 people, 677 households, and 448 families living in the city. The racial makeup of the city was 94.3% White, 1.0% African American, 0.8% Native American, 0.2% Asian, 1.0% from other races, and 2.7% from two or more races. Hispanic or Latino of any race were 3.9% of the population.

There were 677 households, of which 38.1% had children under the age of 18 living with them, 43.7% were married couples living together, 14.8% had a female householder with no husband present, 7.7% had a male householder with no wife present, and 33.8% were non-families. 28.7% of all households were made up of individuals, and 13.5% had someone living alone who was 65 years of age or older. The average household size was 2.55 and the average family size was 3.11.

The median age in the city was 35.8 years. 27.9% of residents were under the age of 18; 8.2% were between the ages of 18 and 24; 26.1% were from 25 to 44; 26.2% were from 45 to 64; and 11.6% were 65 years of age or older. The gender makeup of the city was 47.9% male and 52.1% female.

2000 census
As of the census of 2000, there were 1,843 people, 719 households, and 473 families living in the city. The racial makeup of the city was 97.40% White, 0.33% African American, 0.22% Native American, 0.49% Asian, 0.38% from other races, and 1.19% from two or more races. Hispanic or Latino of any race were 1.09% of the population.

There were 719 households, out of which 36.0% had children under the age of 18 living with them, 44.6% were married couples living together, 15.9% had a female householder with no husband present, and 34.2% were non-families. 28.5% of all households were made up of individuals, and 16.0% had someone living alone who was 65 years of age or older.  The average household size was 2.55 and the average family size was 3.09.

In the city, the population was spread out, with 29.0% under the age of 18, 8.0% from 18 to 24, 30.3% from 25 to 44, 19.2% from 45 to 64, and 13.6% who were 65 years of age or older.  The median age was 35 years. For every 100 females, there were 88.8 males.  For every 100 females age 18 and over, there were 83.6 males.

The median income for a household in the city was $38,681, and the median income for a family was $42,391. Males had a median income of $37,500 versus $21,250 for females. The per capita income for the city was $16,691.  About 3.8% of families and 6.9% of the population were below the poverty line, including 6.9% of those under age 18 and 11.5% of those age 65 or over.

Education
Watervliet is home to six schools and the Watervliet School District. The six schools are as follows:
 Watervliet High School
 South Elementary School
 North Elementary School
 Watervliet Middle School
 St. Joseph Catholic School (Closed in 2015) 
 Grace Christian School

See also

 List of cities in Michigan

References

External links

 
 Watervliet Public Schools Website

Cities in Berrien County, Michigan
Cities in Michigan